Trimbak Bapuji Thombre (IAST:Trimbak Bāpūji Thombare) (13 August 1890 – 5 May 1918), (known popularly as Balkavi or Balkavi Thombre), was a Marathi language poet from Jalgaon district of Maharashtra, India.

Biography
Balkavi was born on 13 August 1889 in a Marathi Deshastha Brahmin family to Bapurao Devaram Thombre and Godatai in Dharangaon village in Khandesh district of Bombay Presidency in British India. His father was employed in police department. Due to frequent shuffling of postings of his father his education suffered a lot. Balkavi had an elder sister and also had an older and younger brother. Due to his father's job he spent his childhood in Jamner, Yawal, Betawad,  Erandol towns of Jalgaon district. Till he went in fourth class he did not involved in poetry writing, in the fourth class he first time read the poems of Sridhar Mahipat.

When Balkavi was 14 years old he traveled Kashmir, Aagra and Mathura with poet R. Vaidya. Balkavi's first ever poem was published at Erandol's Dasha kal weekly magazine, title as Mulans upadesh. When he was 17 he presented his poem in front of large audience at first ever poetic assembly of Maharashtra at Jalgaon. At this very gathering Kanhoba Ranchoddas Kirtikar bestowed him by Balkavi title.

He spent a period of his childhood with writer and poet Narayan Tilak, a Marathi poet from the Konkan region of the Bombay Presidency in British Raj and a convert to Christianity. Narayan Tilak identified the talent within Tryambak and brought him to his home. Laxmibai Tilak had a motherly relationship with Balkavi. She mentioned some of her memories of Balkavi in her autobiography 'Smruti Chitre'.

Notable work

Balkavi's poems are marked by exuberant language. Notable works include:
 
 
 
 

Legacy 
Balkavi's poems was incorporated in Balbharati school text books.

References

Marathi-language writers
1890 births
1918 deaths
20th-century Indian poets
Indian male poets
Poets from Maharashtra
20th-century Indian male writers